A by-election was held for the New South Wales Legislative Assembly electorate of The Lachlan on 2 April 1896 because of the bankruptcy of James Carroll.

Dates

Result

James Carroll was made bankrupt.

See also
Electoral results for the district of Lachlan
List of New South Wales state by-elections

References

1896 elections in Australia
New South Wales state by-elections
1890s in New South Wales